Uno is the debut studio album by Swedish singer-songwriter Uno Svenningsson, released in 1994. It proved successful in Sweden, peaking at number two on the Swedish Albums Chart.

Track listing
 Tid att gå vidare - 4.32
 Till fjärran land - 4.29
 Tro på varann (with Eva Dahlgren) - 4.34
 Om du bara visste  - 4.30
 Under ytan - 3.22
 Nära sanningen - 3.43
 Evigt unga - 4.02
 Skymtar för en stund - 3.39
 Kommer aldrig att förstå dig - 4.15
 Stannar kvar i min dröm - 4.51

Singles
 Tid att gå vidare
 Under ytan
 Tro på varann (with Eva Dahlgren)
 Skymtar för en stund

Charts

References

1994 albums
Uno Svenningsson albums
Swedish-language albums